Stephen "Stig" Paul Abell (born 10 April 1980) is an English journalist, newspaper editor and radio presenter.  He currently co-presents the Monday to Thursday breakfast show on Times Radio with Aasmah Mir.

Abell was from 2016 to 2020 editor of The Times Literary Supplement and from 2013 to 2016 managing editor of The Sun. He was formerly a fiction reviewer at The Spectator and reviewer at Telegraph Media Group as well as The Times Literary Supplement. He was also a presenter on LBC Radio.

Education
Abell was born in Nottingham and educated at Loughborough Grammar School, and studied English at Emmanuel College, Cambridge graduating with a double first.

Career
In September 2001, Abell joined the Press Complaints Commission as a complaints officer; he completed other roles at the PCC including press officer, assistant director and deputy director before being appointed Director of the PCC on 19 December 2010.
In August 2013, Abell joined The Sun as managing editor, his role until the end of April 2016.

In March 2014, Abell started co-presenting a show on LBC Radio alongside Sky News television presenter Kay Burley from 8am to 11am on Sundays. Burley was the main presenter while Abell reviewed the papers and added political comment.

From August 2014, the show was co-presented by Abell and LBC's Petrie Hosken. In January 2015, he was given his own show from 8am to 10am on Sundays. From April 2016, Abell moved to the afternoon slot on Sundays of 3pm to 6pm.

Abell has been heavily criticised for publishing an article in 2015 in The Sun by Katie Hopkins. The article argued for "gunships sending these boats back to their own country", and described migrants as "like cockroaches". It concluded that Britain should "force migrants back to their shores and burn the boats".

In May 2016, Abell became the editor of The Times Literary Supplement, succeeding Sir Peter Stothard, who had edited the newspaper for the previous 14 years. He held the post until June 2020, when he was succeeded by Martin Ivens.

He is a regular presenter on the BBC Radio 4 series Front Row.

In May 2018, Abell's first book, How Britain Really Works, was published by John Murray.

In April 2020, it was announced that Abell would be joining the upcoming radio station Times Radio as a presenter. He was also named as the station's Launch Director.

In November 2020, he released his second book, Things I Learned on the 6:28, a guide to reading. In September 2021, The Bookseller reported HarperCollins had agreed a three-book deal with Abell's agents including his first work of crime fiction and a non-fiction title.

References

1980 births
Living people
English radio presenters
English newspaper editors
English male journalists
People from Nottingham
People educated at Loughborough Grammar School
Alumni of Emmanuel College, Cambridge